The UNTV Cup Season 5 was the 2016–17 season of the annual charity basketball league in the Philippines, UNTV Cup. The tournament organized by UNTV Public Service channel, through its chairman and chief executive officer of BMPI-UNTV, Kuya Daniel Razon, more popularly known as Mr. Public Service.

The season was officially opened on August 29, 2016, at the Mall of Asia Arena, in Pasay, with 13 teams vying for the championship title of the season, including Season 4 champions AFP Cavaliers. A new team was introduced this season called the Bureau of Customs Transformers.

Regular games will be held at the Pasig City Sports Center in Pasig and the University of Makati Gym in Makati, with a live telecast on the UNTV Public Service channel every Sunday afternoons.

During the season, the league got its second AnakTV award for being a child-friendly basketball tournament.

Teams
Thirteen teams, which composed of a new team (BOC Transformers) and twelve returning teams from last season will compete in the tournament. The teams were divided into two groups.

New Teams 
Bureau of Customs will be the new team of the tournament starting this season.
 Bureau of Customs (BOC) Transformers

Group A

Group B

Standings

Game summaries

Preliminary round

Group A

Group B

Second round

The Playoffs

Quarterfinals

Semifinals

BOC vs. Malacañan

Judiciary vs. PNP

Battle for Third Place: Judiciary Magis vs BOC Transformers 
Third placer received one million pesos cash prize (₱1,000,000) and the fourth-place earned five hundred thousand pesos (₱500,000).
 Players of the Game: Chester Tolomia and Warren Ybañez

Finals

Game 1 
 Players of the Game: Christian Luanzon & Eric Dela Cuesta

Game 2 
 Best Player of the Game: Ollan Omiping

Game 3

Winners and beneficiaries
A total of 8.4 million pesos tax-free was given to the teams' chosen beneficiaries, with the champion team PNP Responders taking home a trophy, and 4 million pesos given to their chosen charity institution. The runner-up team Malacañang Kamao received 2 million pesos for their beneficiary. One million pesos was given to the third place team Judiciary Magis for their chosen beneficiary. Five hundred thousand pesos was given to the fourth-place finishers BOC Transformers for their chosen charity. The other participating teams got 100 thousand pesos for their beneficiary.

Individual Awards

Season Awards

Scoring Champion: Chester Tolomia (Judiciary Magis)
Step Up Player of the Season: Ian Vincent Garrido (Malacañang Kamao)
Defensive Player of the Season: Harold Sta. Cruz (PNP Responders)
Starting Five:
 Visnu Das Javier (Malacañang Kamao)
 Jeffrey Quiambao (AFP Cavaliers)
 Gilbert Malabanan (BFP Firefighters)
 Ollan Omiping (PNP Responders)
 Chester Tolomia (Judiciary Magis)
Most Valuable Player:
Season MVP: Chester Tolomia (Judiciary Magis)
Finals MVP:

Top Players of the Season
The following players have excelled in their respective categories.

Players of the Week
The following players were named the Players of the Week.

UNTV Cup Segments

Heart of a Champion
The Heart of a Champion segment features UNTV Cup players and their lives off the court as public servants.

Top Plays
The following segment features the top plays of the week and elimination round.

Player, Analyst and Fan Interviews
UNTV Cup players, analysts, and fans share their thoughts in interviews.

See also 
 UNTV Cup

References

External links 
 UNTVweb.com

Members Church of God International
2016 Philippine television series debuts
2016 in Philippine sport
2017 in Philippine sport
UNTV Cup
UNTV (Philippines) original programming
2016–17 in Philippine basketball
2016–17 in Philippine basketball leagues